Aziza is a short film directed by Soudade Kaadan and produced by KAF Production. It premiered on January 25, 2019 at the Sundance Film Festival and was awarded the Short Film Grand Jury Prize.

Plot 
Ayman, a migrant from Syria living in Lebanon is instructing his wife to drive the car that is what is left of his country in his life.

References

External links
 

2019 films
Lebanese short films
2010s Arabic-language films
Sundance Film Festival award winners
2019 short films